This is a list of Catholic colleges of the National Collegiate Athletic Association (NCAA) that have football as a varsity sport in the United States. It also includes a list of Catholic colleges and universities which previously had major football programs.

For current programs, all conference affiliations are current for the next football season of 2019.

NCAA Division I Football Bowl Subdivision

NCAA Division I Football Championship Subdivision

NCAA Division II

NCAA Division III

Disbanded programs

See also
List of NCAA Division I FBS football programs
List of NCAA Division I FCS football programs
List of NCAA Division II football programs
List of NCAA Division III football programs

Lists of college football teams
Lists of Catholic universities and colleges